The National Guard Naval Service Corps (Морские части Войск Национальной Гвардии России, Morskiye Chasti Voysk Natsional'noy Gvardii Rossii) is the naval service, water police and coast guard branch of the National Guard Forces Command, National Guard of Russia. Formerly the Naval Service of the Internal Troops of Russia, it was established in 1978 through the fulfillment of a 1976 resolution of the  Politburo of the Communist Party of the Soviet Union and a 1978 decree of the Council of Ministers of the Soviet Union.

Brief history 
The roots of this service may be traced to the May 5, 1976 Resolution "On the Protection of artificial structures on the Trans-Baikal and Far Eastern Railways" of the Politburo of the Communist Party of the Soviet Union. The resolution created  an interdepartmental commission for inspection of underwater structures and make recommendations for their protection. As a result, problems have been identified for both the Baikal-Amur Mainline and the Trans-Siberian Railway, providing the basis for the 1978 formation of the first units of boats and naval divers of what was then the Naval Service of the Internal Troops of the Ministry of Internal Affairs of the Union of Socialist Soviet Republics or NS-IT-MIA-USSR (Морские части внутренних войск МВД CCCP, Moskoy Chasti Vnutrenniye Voiska MVD SSSR) with the approval of the suggested measures and subsequent decrees of the Council of Ministers. The naval service, while sporting uniforms similar to the Soviet Navy would provide public order and security, inland waters and waterways security and lifesaving functions for the Ministry of Internal Affairs. Only with the raising of the Naval Service did the problems facing the waterways, as well as lifesaving duties in these areas, began to be resolved.

In 1981 the current uniform and officer ranking system was adopted, in 1983 special flags were issued (today's flags feature the state naval ensign on the maroon background), and in 1985, the warrant officer and rating ranks were officially standardized. In 1984, through a general order of the chief of internal troops of the parts on the protection of sea lanes, two patrol boat divisions were raised. In 1988, on this basis, a separate detachment of patrol boats was established. A Divers' Training Center was included in its composition (established in 1987) for training and retraining of divers of the Naval Service, which would form the basis for today's National Guard Naval Diving Service.

Through a Decree of the USSR Council of Ministers on May 18, 1989 "On the Repair and technological enterprise of the nuclear fleet" (which gave military protection to personnel from today's FSUE Atomflot and the Murmansk Shipping Company) and a Decreee of the Council on August 3 the same year the organizational and staffing structure was approved for the 2 naval patrol boat divisions assigned in Murmansk to the Naval Service of the MVD.

On the basis of part of personnel of the 1st Naval Detachment (Khabarovsk), the 5th Independent Maritime Training Division (Severobaikalsk) was raised on October 1, 1996. This division's cadets are trained in specialties: diver-shooter, mechanic, and boat captains. According to data for 2002, it created the basis for specialty training steering for signalmen.

As of April 15, 2016, the NS-IT-MIA-RF has transformed into the NGNSC-NGFC of the National Guard and reports directly to the Security Council.

Naval Service Units 
 1st Detachment (Khabarovsk)
 2nd Detachment (Murmansk)
 5th Independent Maritime Training Division (Severobaikalsk, Buryatia)
 32nd Detachment (Ozyorsk, Chelyabinsk Oblast)
 Independent Patrol Division (Sosnovy Bor, Leningrad Oblast)
 Naval Detachment of the NGFC Ural District Command (Yekaterinburg)

Missions 
 to ensure the safety of important public facilities and communications structures, located in the coastal lands and waters of the Russian Federation, the territorial seas, the rivers, lakes and other surface water bodies
 participation in disaster relief and other emergencies on the specified protected objects and structures in waterways (together with the Ministry of Emergency Situations and the Coast Guard of the Federal Security Service Border Service)
 Conducting anti-terrorism operations and combating illegal weapons trade in the inland and coastal waters of Russia
 participate jointly with the Police of Russia in maintaining public order and security in the important waterways located in areas with the most valuable natural resources, determining the list of which is approved by the Government of Russia
 assisting in border security with the Border Service of the Federal Security Service of the Russian Federation through the Coast Guard of the Federal Security Service Border Service
 wartime and peacetime functions as the inland and coastal counterweight of the Russian Navy and other uniformed organizations as may be called by the President in his duty as Supreme Commander of the Armed Forces and Chairman of the Security Council, through the Commander of the National Guard
if necessary conduct lifesaving operations in strategic waters together with the Ministry of Emergency Situations

Gallery

See also 

 National Guard of Russia
 National Guard Forces Command
 Coast Guard (Russia)

References 

 МВД России, энциклопедия. Москва: Объед. редакция МВД России, «Олма-пресс», 2002. 
 Скрынник А.М., Стракович В.В., Пухарев И.В. Правовые основы деятельности морских воинских частей внутренних войск МВД России. Ростов-на-Дону, 2007.

Gendarmerie
Law enforcement agencies of Russia
Military of Russia
Military units and formations established in 1978
National Guard of Russia
Units and formations of the National Guard of Russia